Phelsuma pusilla, the lesser day gecko, is a species of gecko found in Madagascar.

References

Phelsuma
Reptiles described in 1964